KJAS 107.3 FM is a radio station licensed to Jasper, Texas.  The station broadcasts an adult contemporary format from Westwood One and is owned by James M. Lout DBA Rayburn Broadcasting, Inc.

References

External links
KJAS's official website

JAS
Mainstream adult contemporary radio stations in the United States